Kim Hye-Jin (born May 3, 1994, in Chungcheongnam-do) is a South Korean swimmer, who specialized in breaststroke events. Kim qualified for the women's 100 m breaststroke at the 2012 Summer Olympics in London, by eclipsing a FINA B-standard entry time of 1:08.80 from the Dong-A Swimming Tournament in Ulsan. She challenged seven other swimmers on the third heat, including three-time Olympian Alia Atkinson of Jamaica. Kim raced to seventh place by 0.36 of a second behind Turkey's Dilara Buse Günaydın, outside her entry time of 1:09.79. Kim failed to advance into the semifinals, as she placed thirty-third overall in the preliminary heats.

References

External links
NBC Olympics Profile

1994 births
Living people
Sportspeople from South Chungcheong Province
South Korean female breaststroke swimmers
Swimmers at the 2010 Summer Youth Olympics
Swimmers at the 2012 Summer Olympics
Olympic swimmers of South Korea
Swimmers at the 2018 Asian Games
Asian Games competitors for South Korea
21st-century South Korean women